Yordan Yovchev Yovchev (born February 24, 1973), also spelled Jordan Jovtchev, is a retired Bulgarian gymnast. He took part in six consecutive Olympic Games, more than any other Bulgarian athlete in Olympic history. He is president of the Bulgarian Gymnastics Federation and also serves as a sports commentator.

Biography

Yovchev was born in Plovdiv, Bulgaria.  He won silver in the men's rings at the 2004 Summer Olympics in Athens with a score of 9.850.  In the same Olympic Games, Yovchev won bronze in the men's floor exercise with a score of 9.775. In the 2000 Olympics in Sydney, Australia, he won the bronze on both floor exercise and still rings with 9.787 and 9.762 respectively. He also won two World Championship Bronze medals in the all around (1999, 2001).

Yovchev made his fifth Olympic team for the Beijing Olympics in 2008, and qualified again for the Rings exercise.  He qualified second with a score of 16.275 under the new scoring system, but missed a handstand and finished the final in last place with a score of 15.525.

He has competed in many SASUKE tournaments, reaching the final stage in the 8th competition; he did not pass the spider climb in the first 15 seconds, so the walls spread apart and he fell.  He is the only competitor to not pass the spider climb in this version of the final stage, other than Shingo Yamamoto who did not complete it due to injury, but his early failure could be attributed to the heavy rain during the entire competition.  Since then he has not passed the third stage.

He, Krasimir Dunev, and Ivan Ivankov moved to the United States after the 1996 Summer Olympics, staying in Detroit, Michigan as they wanted to compete professionally in the United States. During his career, he turned down proposals to change his sporting allegiance and compete for the United States.

He coached and trained in Norman, Oklahoma, and Houston, Texas, before moving back to Bulgaria in 2007. He and his wife, Boriana, have a son, Yordan, Jr.

In 2009, he was elected president of the Bulgarian Gymnastics Federation.

Yordan Yovchev qualified and participated in the 2012 Summer Olympics in London, which was his 6th appearance at the Olympic Games, a record at that time for a gymnast, along with Oksana Chusovitina who also made her 6th Olympic appearance in 2012 (she now holds the record alone, having competed in her 8th Olympics in 2021). He was also his country's flagbearer during the opening ceremony. Yovchev officially retired from the sport in February 2013.

In 2016, he was inducted in the International Gymnastics Hall of Fame.

Results on SASUKE
8th competition (59): Failed Spider Climb - Final Stage
12th competition (99): Failed Cliff Hanger - Third Stage
14th competition (91): Failed Cliff Hanger - Third Stage
15th competition (97): Failed Warped Wall - First Stage
16th competition (95): Failed Cliff Hanger - Third Stage
20th competition (1993)*: Failed Warped Wall - First Stage
23rd competition (79): Failed Rope Ladder - First Stage
 *In the 20th competition, the numbering system for the contestants ran from 1901-2000 to indicate that 2000 competitors have attempted SASUKE. Instead of being number 93, Yovchev's number was 1993.

References

External links
 
 
 

1973 births
Living people
Bulgarian male artistic gymnasts
Sportspeople from Plovdiv
World champion gymnasts
European champions in gymnastics
Medalists at the World Artistic Gymnastics Championships
Gymnasts at the 1992 Summer Olympics
Gymnasts at the 1996 Summer Olympics
Gymnasts at the 2000 Summer Olympics
Gymnasts at the 2004 Summer Olympics
Gymnasts at the 2008 Summer Olympics
Gymnasts at the 2012 Summer Olympics
Olympic silver medalists for Bulgaria
Olympic bronze medalists for Bulgaria
Olympic gymnasts of Bulgaria
Sasuke (TV series) contestants
Bulgarian expatriates in the United States
Olympic medalists in gymnastics
Medalists at the 2004 Summer Olympics
Goodwill Games medalists in gymnastics
Competitors at the 2001 Goodwill Games